Andrew J. Dollar (born December 2, 2000) is an American professional stock car racing driver. He last competed part-time in the NASCAR Xfinity Series, driving the No. 18 Toyota Supra for Joe Gibbs Racing and part-time in the ARCA Menards Series, driving the No. 18 Toyota Camry for Kyle Busch Motorsports. He has raced in the NASCAR Camping World Truck Series, ARCA Menards Series East and the ARCA Menards Series West.

Racing career
Dollar signed with DGR-Crosley in October 2018 to drive part-time in what was then known as the NASCAR K&N Pro Series East as well as in the CARS Late Model Stock Tour.

Dollar was put in the No. 54 car when the season started, and drove it for the first seven races of the year. He also drove the No. 17 in one race, the season finale at Dover. In his first race in the series and with his team, which came at New Smyrna, he qualified second, led 48 laps and finished ninth in the race. He ended up running almost all the races in his rookie season, only missing out on Watkins Glen, Bristol, Gateway, and New Hampshire. With his solid finishes (all but one were top-10's), he was able to finish ninth in points.

Also, Dollar competed in two ARCA Menards Series races for DGR-Crosley, driving their No. 4 Toyota at both Gateway and Kansas, finishing 6th and 7th, respectfully, as well as one K&N Pro Series West race at Phoenix in preparation for the new ARCA race at the track which was added to the schedule for the following year. In his first West Series start, he finished 18th after a crash.

It was announced on December 19, 2019, that Dollar would be moving from DGR to Venturini Motorsports for the 2020 season, running full-time in ARCA in the No. 15 Toyota, replacing Christian Eckes, who moved up to the Truck Series full-time with Kyle Busch Motorsports after winning the 2019 series championship. Crew chief Shannon Rursch, who worked with Michael Self's No. 25 Venturini ARCA team in 2019, was announced to lead Dollar's No. 15 team in 2020. On June 20, 2020, Dollar got his first ARCA Menards Series win at Talladega. It was only his 5th start in the series. At the conclusion of the season, Dollar was fourth in the championship and was runner-up in Rookie of the Year standings.
 
In 2021, Dollar returned to Venturini, but was reduced down to a part-time schedule in the No. 15 with former Bill McAnally Racing ARCA West Series driver Gracie Trotter, and was given 11 races in the big ARCA Series, plus one additional race in both the East Series (at Dover) and West Series (at Phoenix in November). On January 28, 2021, it was announced that Dollar would run a part-time schedule in the NASCAR Camping World Truck Series in the No. 51 for Kyle Busch Motorsports, another team that is part of the Toyota development pipeline. His eight race schedule begins with the season-opener at Daytona.

Motorsports career results

NASCAR
(key) (Bold – Pole position awarded by qualifying time. Italics – Pole position earned by points standings or practice time. * – Most laps led.)

Xfinity Series

Camping World Truck Series

ARCA Menards Series
(key) (Bold – Pole position awarded by qualifying time. Italics – Pole position earned by points standings or practice time. * – Most laps led.)

ARCA Menards Series East

ARCA Menards Series West

 Season still in progress

References

External links
 
 

Living people
NASCAR drivers
ARCA Menards Series drivers
Racing drivers from Atlanta
Racing drivers from Georgia (U.S. state)
2000 births
CARS Tour drivers
Kyle Busch Motorsports drivers
Joe Gibbs Racing drivers